Robert Görlinger (29 July 1888 – 10 February 1954) was a German politician of the Social Democratic Party (SPD) and member of the German Bundestag.

Life 
In 1946/47 he was a member of the two Appointed State Parliaments of North Rhine-Westphalia, where he was deputy chairman of the SPD parliamentary group, and subsequently a member of the first elected state parliament until his resignation on 3 September 1949. He was a member of the German Bundestag from the first Bundestag elections in 1949 until his death. He had entered parliament via the North Rhine-Westphalia state list.

Literature

References 

 
1888 births 
1954 deaths
Members of the Bundestag for North Rhine-Westphalia
Members of the Bundestag 1953–1957
Members of the Bundestag 1949–1953
Members of the Bundestag for the Social Democratic Party of Germany
Members of the Landtag of North Rhine-Westphalia